Dolly Mattoo (née Minhas) (born 8 February 1968) is an Indian actress and former model, well known for winning the Miss India Universe contest in 1988. She has acted in Hindi, Punjabi, and Kannada films. She has also worked in Hindi TV shows such as Iss Pyaar Ko Kya Naam Doon? Ek Baar Phir and Choti Sarrdaarni. During the 1990s, she worked in negative shades in Mukesh Khanna's popular serial Mahayoddha as Rajkumari Bijli and in Shaktimaan as Shaliyaa - Catwoman; considered as India's first actress to play Catwoman (including Ashwini Kalsekar, whom with she shared the screen as her elder sister). She is currently acting in Shaadi Mubarak as Kushala Tibrewal.

Biography
She belongs to Punjab and was raised in Chandigarh. She fell in love with the director of her first film, Anil Mattoo, whom she eventually married. She later acted in some Punjabi and Kannada films and Hindi TV serials.

Television
 Hindustani (1996-1999)
 Dil Vil Pyar Vyar (1998)
 Shaktimaan (1999)
  Ramayan (2001-2002)
 Vishnu Puran (2003)
 Mamla Gadbad Hai (2001)
 Zindagi Milke Bitange (2001)
 Aisa Des Hai Mera (2006)
 Grihasti (2008)
 Baa Bahoo Aur Baby (2010)
 Behenein (2010/2011)
 Chintu Chinki Aur Ek Badi Si Love Story (2011/2012)
 Byaah Hamari Bahoo Ka (2012)
 Punar Vivah (2013)
 Savdhaan India (2014)
 Hukum Mere Aaka...
 Iss Pyaar Ko Kya Naam Doon? Ek Baar Phir (2015)
 Kota Toppers (2015)
 Adhuri Kahaani Hamari (2015)
 Dil Se Dil Tak
 Silsila Badalte Rishton Ka 
 Choti Sarrdaarni (2019–2022)
 Shaadi Mubarak (2020–2021)
 Ghum Hai Kisikey Pyaar Meiin (2021)

Filmography

Hindi films
 Dastoor (1991)
 Mr. Bond (1992)
 Kshatriya (1993)
 Game (1993)
 Ab Ke Baras (2002)
 Pyaar Mein Twist (2005)
 Don Muthu Swami (2008)
 Good Luck! (2008)
 Dil Dhadakne Do (2015)
 Kabir Singh (2019)

Swedish films
 Bombay Dreams (2004)

Punjabi films
 Mitti Wajaan Maardi (2007)
 Sat Sri Akal (2008)
 Tera Mera Ki Rishta (2009)
 Mel Karade Rabba (2010)
 Jatt & Juliet 2  (2013)

Kannada films
 Rayaru Bandaru Mavana Manege (1993)
 Mr. Mahesh Kumar (1994)
 Musuku (1994)
 Makkala Sakshi (1994)
 Yama kinkara (1995)
 Chiranjeevi Rajegowda (1995)
 Mr. Vasu (1996)
 Honey Moon (1996)
 Rambo Raja Revolver Rani (1996)
 Kalavida (1997)

References

External links

1968 births
Living people
Actresses from Chandigarh
Actresses in Hindi cinema
Actresses in Hindi television
Actresses in Kannada cinema
Actresses in Punjabi cinema
Indian film actresses
Indian soap opera actresses
Indian television actresses
Female models from Chandigarh
Femina Miss India winners
Miss Universe 1989 contestants
Punjabi people
20th-century Indian actresses
21st-century Indian actresses